Glaciihabitans arcticus is a Gram-positive, rod-shaped, psychrotolerant and non-motile bacterium from the genus Glaciihabitans which has been isolated from soil from the Cambridge Bay.

References

Microbacteriaceae
Bacteria described in 2019